SP45 is the name for a Polish diesel locomotive. It was built for the purpose of passenger traffic.
No operating examples of this loco remain. All have been phased out or rebuilt into SU45.

History
In the early 1960s in Poland an urgent need became apparent to introduce locomotives capable of servicing passenger traffic on main and secondary rail routes. The number of steam locomotives was shrinking and electrification was far too slow to introduce electric locos on a large scale.

Prototypes
In the second half of the 1960s a few models of a new locomotive, with Co-Co bogies and electric transmission, were built at the Hipolit Cegielski Metal Works in Poznań. In general, all prototypes differed by engine-alternator combination. The final decision was to use a Fiat-licensed engine and an Alsthom-licensed alternator.

Introduction
The first locos were assigned to the Poznań railway district, and on successfully passing the necessary tests, they entered service in Warsaw. Between 1970 and 1976, a total number of 265 locomotives were produced. This type served on all main routes in Poland

Production

Present days
All locomotives of this type were rebuilt into SU45 (with a new heating system) or phased out.

Locomotive assignment

Nicknames
These locomotives used to be called the following names:
Fiat - because of diesel engine licensed by Fiat
Suka (eng. bitch) - from the two first letters of the code name (SUka - after conversion to SU45 class)

See also
Polish locomotives designation

External links

Modern Locos Gallery
Rail Service
Mikoleje
Chabówka Rail Museum

Diesel-electric locomotives of Poland
Co′Co′ locomotives
Railway locomotives introduced in 1970
Standard gauge locomotives of Poland